WREB was a radio station licensed to Holyoke, Massachusetts, broadcasting at 930 kHz AM.  WREB left the air in September 1991 and its FCC license is deleted. The call letters were reassigned and are now used by an FM radio station in Greencastle, Indiana.

WREB  was a 500-watt daytime, omnidirectional station. They were a music station playing primarily MOR through the 1960s.  In 1968 there was summer evening rock show  called "The Man From REB."  Weekends were heavily religious and ethnic, including music programs in French (Leon Allary), Polish (Chet Dragon) and Italian. Local high school football was featured on Saturday afternoons.  In 1971 they switched from MOR to a country music format with Cal McLain doing the morning show.  In 1972 they switched to a talk format headlined by Tracy Cole, but continued with country music on the weekends and summer evenings. Long term on-air personalities were Wayne Dennis (PD, DJ and sports), Barbara Heisler (DJ and talk), Richard LaVigne (news & commentary) and Steve Hudgik (DJ).

WREB had studios at 300 High Street in Holyoke and their transmitter in Fairview (Chicopee).

References

Defunct radio stations in the United States
Mass media in Holyoke, Massachusetts
REB
REB
Mass media in Hampden County, Massachusetts
Radio stations established in 1950
Radio stations disestablished in 1991
1950 establishments in Massachusetts
1991 disestablishments in Massachusetts
REB